Zonalny (masculine), Zonalnaya (feminine), or Zonalnoye (neuter) is the name of several rural localities in Russia:
Zonalny, Novosibirsk Oblast, a settlement in Iskitimsky District of Novosibirsk Oblast
Zonalny, Sverdlovsk Oblast, a settlement in Prigorodny District of Sverdlovsk Oblast
Zonalny, Volgograd Oblast, a khutor in Kirovsky Selsoviet of Sredneakhtubinsky District of Volgograd Oblast
Zonalnoye, Altai Krai, a selo in Zonalny Selsoviet of Zonalny District of Altai Krai
Zonalnoye, Sakhalin Oblast, a selo in Tymovsky District of Sakhalin Oblast

Renamed localities
Loris, Russia, a rural locality under the administrative jurisdiction of Karasunsky Okrug of the city of Krasnodar, Krasnodar Krai, called Zonalny until July 2011

See also
Tatarskoy zonalnoy opytnoy stantsii, a settlement in Kamsko-Ustyinsky District of the Republic of Tatarstan
Zonalnaya Stantsiya, a settlement in Tomsky District of Tomsk Oblast